Nimdangi (also Romanized as Nīmdāngī; also known as Nīmdāng) is a village in Sanjabi Rural District, Kuzaran District, Kermanshah County, Kermanshah Province, Iran. At the 2006 census, its population was 65, in 13 families.

References 

Populated places in Kermanshah County